Ryan King may refer to:
 Ryan King (Canadian football)
 Ryan King (cricketer)
 Ryan King (rugby league)